2008 Czech Lion Awards ceremony was held on 5 March 2009.

Winners and nominees

Non-statutory Awards

References

2008 film awards
Czech Lion Awards ceremonies